Thomas Farnan (3 June 1914 – 2 October 1977) was an association football player who represented New Zealand at international level.

Farnan made a single appearance in an official international for the All Whites in a 1–7 loss to Australia on 4 July 1936.

Farnan transferred from Ponsonby to Mosgiel on 14 April 1936 for a single season before returning to Ponsonby the following year.

References 

1914 births
1977 deaths
New Zealand association footballers
New Zealand international footballers
Association football inside forwards